PCI Geomatica is a remote sensing and photogrammetry desktop software package for processing earth observation data, designed by the PCI Geomatics company. The latest version of the software is Geomatica 2018. Geomatica is aimed primarily at faster data processing and allows users to load satellite and aerial imagery where advanced analysis can be performed. Geomatica has been used by many educational institutions and scientific programs throughout the world to analyze satellite imagery and trends, such as the GlobeSAR Program, a program which was carried out by the Canada Centre for Remote Sensing in the 1990s.

A very popular edition of Geomatica is known as Freeview, which permits users to load multiple types of satellite images as well as geospatial data that is stored in different formats. The software is available for download over the web, and has registered several thousands of downloads.

Image processing packages
Geomatica is one of several software packages available to the educational, commercial, and military users. Other similar packages include Erdas Imagine, Envi, and SocetSet (or Socet GXP). An independent review of the software and its functionality written by Directions Magazine is included here: http://www.directionsmag.com/articles/product-review-pci146s-geomatica-10/123136. Geomatica has also been compared to Envi and Erdas Imagine as it relates to orthorectification. http://www.isprs.org/proceedings/XXXVII/congress/4_pdf/283.pdf

Educational institutions using Geomatica
Over 2,700 educational institutions worldwide have used Geomatica as part of their Remote Sensing course delivery, some of which are listed here
 University of Calgary, Geomatics Engineering program
 York University, Geomatics Engineering programs, Toronto, Ontario, Canada
 University of New Brunswick, Online Course offered on Radarsat-2 and Polarimetry
 Fleming College, Lindsay, Ontario, Canada
 Carleton University, Ottawa, Canada
 University of Waterloo, Waterloo, Ontario, Canada
 British Columbia Institute of Technology (BCIT)
 Université du Québec à Montréal, Remote Sensing course GEO8142
 Aalto University, Institute of Photogrammetry and Remote Sensing
 North Eastern University (NEU), Boston, USA
 University of Arkansas
 University of Victoria
 Fanshawe College, London, Ontario
 TU Bergakademie Freiberg, Remote Sensing Group
 Saint Mary's University (SMU), Halifax, Nova Scotia, Canada.  Department of Geography and Environmental Studies
 Stellenbosch University, Department of Geography and Environmental Studies and Centre for Geographical Analysis, South Africa

Open Geospatial Consortium
Geomatica includes a web coverage service interface that complies with the OGC Web Coverage Service (WCS) Interface Standard, which is a key area in which PCI Geomatics has contributed. Remote Sensing data providers distribute data in diverse formats, which makes sharing information across many different platforms challenging. WCS seeks to alleviate some of the data sharing challenges by publishing the geographic information and layers openly over the web.

Contributions to open standards
Geomatica adheres to open standards to promote sharing and collaboration of earth observation data. An SDK that makes the PCIDSK file format available to the community is available through the GDAL website here:  
https://archive.today/20130414193214/http://home.gdal.org/projects/pcidsk/

References

External links
 Versions of the software
 Geomatica 2018 (https://www.pcigeomatics.com/pressnews/2018-Release_Geomatica_GXL_2018.pdf)
 Geomatica 2017 (https://www.pcigeomatics.com/pressnews/2017_PCI_Geomatica_Release.pdf)
 Geomatica 2016 (http://www.pcigeomatics.com/pressnews/2016_PCI_Geomatica.pdf)
 Geomatica 2015 (http://www.pcigeomatics.com/pressnews/2015_PCI_Geomatica-15.pdf)
 Geomatica 2014 (http://www.pcigeomatics.com/pressnews/2014_PCI_Geomatica_2014.pdf)
 Geomatica 2013 (http://www.pcigeomatics.com/pressnews/2012_PCI_Geomatica2013_Release1.pdf)
 Geomatica 2012 (http://www.pcigeomatics.com/pressnews/2011_PCI_Geomatica2012.pdf)

Remote sensing software
Photogrammetry software